Leigh Christine Habler (born 29 April 1976), is an Australian former swimming representative.

Swimming career
At age 11, swimming for the Academy club in Sydney, Habler set two New South Wales records for her age in the 1987 Metropolitan Swimming Championships. She was described as "one of the greatest Olympic prospects for her age for very many years" by coach Forbes Carlile. 

Habler represented Australia at the 1992 Barcelona Olympics and placed eighth in the final of the women's 200 m backstroke. She then finished second in the 1992 Australian Short Course Swimming Championships.

In 1995 Habler competed in the 200 m backstroke event at the World Short Course Championships and finished third.

References

1976 births
Living people
Olympic swimmers of Australia
Swimmers at the 1992 Summer Olympics
Australian female backstroke swimmers
Competitors at the 2001 World Games
World Games gold medalists